Warren Burton (October 23, 1944 – October 2, 2017) was an American actor. During the late 1970s and throughout the 1990s, he was seen on several daytime soap operas, usually in villainous roles.

Burton was born and raised in Chicago, Illinois and attended Roosevelt High School and the Art Institute of Chicago. He began his acting career in Chicago theatre before moving to New York to pursue a career there. He appeared in a number of Broadway and Off-Broadway theatre productions such as Gypsy and Hair. 

He played the role of Eddie Dorrance #3 on All My Children from 1978 to 1979 and won a Daytime Emmy for Outstanding Supporting Actor at the 1980 awards broadcast. Other daytime roles included Jason Dunlap on Another World (1980-82); Warren Andrews on Guiding Light (1983-87); Phillip Hamilton on Santa Barbara (1988-89) and Dr. Hepler on The Bold And the Beautiful (1995). He appeared in the made-for-TV movie The Girl Most Likely to... in 1973. Burton portrayed Confederate general Henry Heth in the 1993 film Gettysburg. 

Since the late 1990s, Burton was a voice actor for numerous video games, including the Jak and Daxter series, Prince of Persia: The Sands of Time, Psychonauts, Battlezone II: Combat Commander, and Nox, among several others.

Filmography

Film

Television

Video games

References

External links

Warren Burton at Find a Grave

1944 births
2017 deaths
Place of death missing
American male stage actors
American male film actors
American male voice actors
American male video game actors
American male television actors
American male soap opera actors
Daytime Emmy Award winners
Burials at Hollywood Forever Cemetery
Daytime Emmy Award for Outstanding Supporting Actor in a Drama Series winners
Male actors from Chicago